Darevskia rostombekowi is a species of lizard in the family Lacertidae. The species is endemic to Transcaucasia.

Etymology
The specific name, rostombekowi, is in honor of Georgian biologist V. N. Rostombekov.

Geographic range
D. rostombekowi is found in Armenia and Azerbaijan.

Habitat

Reproduction
D. rostombekowi is oviparous and parthenogenetic.

References

Further reading
Darevsky IS (1957). "СИСТЕМАТИКА И ЭКОЛОГИЯ СКАЛЪНЪІХ ЯЩЕРИЦ LACERTA SAXICOLA EVERSMANN, РАСПРОСТРАНЕННЪІХ В АРМЕНИИ [=Systematics and ecology of rock lizards, Lacerta saxicola Eversmann, in Armenia]". [Zoologicheskii Sbornik, Akademiya Nauk Armyanskoi SSR ] 10: 27-57. (Lacerta saxicola rostombekowi, new subspecies, p. 35). (in Russian, with an abstract in Armenian).
Sindaco R, Jeremčenko VK (2008). The Reptiles of the Western Palearctic. 1. Annotated Checklist and Distributional Atlas of the Turtles, Crocodiles, Amphisbaenians and Lizards of Europe, North Africa, Middle East and Central Asia. (Monographs of the Societas Herpetologica Italica). Latina, Italy: Edizioni Belvedere. 580 pp. .

Darevskia
Reptiles described in 1957
Taxa named by Ilya Darevsky